"Which Side Are You On?" is the sixth episode of the first season of the HBO satirical comedy-drama television series Succession. It was written by Susan Soon He Stanton and directed by Andrij Parekh, and aired on July 8, 2018.

The episode sees Kendall attempt to stage a vote of no confidence against his father among members of Waystar's board, while Shiv gets closer to a promising but dangerous next step in her political career.

Plot
As the vote of no confidence against Logan approaches, Kendall works to assemble as many of Waystar's shareholders to his side as possible. Roman helps out by convincing Lawrence, who is still at odds with Kendall, to take his side. Logan, meanwhile, arrives in Washington, D.C. to meet with the President of the United States, but the meeting is cut short at the last minute amid a possible terror threat. Logan is incensed and believes he has been snubbed.

Shiv has dinner with her ex-boyfriend and fellow political fixer Nate, who floats the possibility of the two of them working for Logan's political nemesis on his presidential campaign. Shiv later spends the night in Nate's apartment, albeit in a separate room; the two of them nonetheless remain sexually attracted to one another despite both being engaged.

Tom decides to reward Greg for seemingly destroying the documents pertaining to misconduct on the company's cruises by treating him to an expensive dinner. Greg, however, is obliged to first have dinner with his grandfather Ewan while he is still in New York. Ewan informs Greg that he is there to attend the vote against Logan, and advises that Greg stay out of the matter. Greg then attends his second dinner of the night with Tom and mentions the vote; Tom is surprised, having not been told about it beforehand, and calls Kendall to get up to date on the situation.

Kendall, meanwhile, visits an unsuspecting Logan and has an amicable home dinner with him on Marcia's request. The next morning, he flies to Long Island to secure the vote of ailing board member Ilona Shinoy, who is still ambivalent about ousting Logan. Kendall manages to sway her to his side, but is unable to fly back to Manhattan, which has temporarily become a no-fly zone in the wake of the terror threat. Kendall attempts to take a cab back to Waystar's offices, but gets stuck in traffic and decides to hurry to the vote on foot.

As Kendall rushes to the company building, Frank calls a board meeting and ambushes Logan with the vote of no confidence; Kendall reads his memorized statement over the phone to officiate the motion. Frank attempts to stall the vote until Kendall arrives, but Logan breaks company policy by refusing to leave the room and instead berates numerous board members (including Roman) into siding with him. Gerri, Lawrence and Stewy abstain from the vote, considering it a family dispute, while Ewan sides with his brother despite his moral misgivings about Logan and his company. Kendall finally arrives at the boardroom, but Logan fires him alongside everyone else who voted in favor of the motion, Frank included. A devastated Kendall is escorted out of the building by security. Later in the day, the President calls Logan back after the terror threat subsides; Logan remarks on having dealt with "terrorists of his own."

Production
"Which Side Are You On?" was written by Susan Soon He Stanton and directed by Andrij Parekh, who also served as the series' cinematographer for several episodes of the season. The title derives from the song of the same name by social activist Florence Reece, who wrote it on behalf of the United Mine Workers labor union. Pete Seeger's rendition of the song plays at the end of the episode as Logan takes a call from the President of the United States.

Series showrunner Jesse Armstrong told Vanity Fair that the vote of no confidence against Logan was inspired by Disney's 2004 shareholder meeting, in which Michael Eisner was voted out of his position as the company's chairman after 20 years of holding the title. Eisner nonetheless retained his position on the board and stayed with Disney for another year before being replaced by Bob Iger.

Reception

Ratings
Upon airing, the episode was watched by 0.673 million viewers with an 18-49 rating of 0.20.

Critical reception
"Which Side Are You On?" received critical acclaim, with many reviewers considering it a turning point for the series' quality. Randall Colburn of The A.V. Club gave the episode an A−, praising the "queasiness" of Parekh's direction during the episode's climax and crediting the performances of Brian Cox and Peter Friedman for giving the scene its energy. Vox called the episode's ending sequence "heart-pounding" and suggested that the episode helped the series grow into "one of the most deftly executed dramas currently on TV." In contrast, Sean T. Collins of Decider was less positive about the episode, admitting that "a whole lot of viewers were firmly on Succession's side" after viewing it, but personally criticizing the episode's climax as contrived and "[thrown] out of balance" by the introduction of too many new characters to represent the company's board. Collins, however, praised Cox and Jeremy Strong's performances.

References

External links
 "Which Side Are You On?" at HBO
 

2018 American television episodes
Succession (TV series)